Michael Wesley Hinnant (born September 8, 1966) is a former American professional football player who was a tight end in the National Football League (NFL) and the World League of American Football (WLAF). He played for the Pittsburgh Steelers and Detroit Lions of the NFL, and the Barcelona Dragons of the WLAF. Hinnant played collegiately at Temple University.

References

1966 births
Living people
American football tight ends
Barcelona Dragons players
Detroit Lions players
Pittsburgh Steelers players
Players of American football from Washington, D.C.
Temple Owls football players